The Ialpug is a river that crosses Moldova and the Odessa Oblast of Ukraine. It rises in the vicinity of the village Tomai, Leova District), flows in the south direction in parallel with the Prut, Cimișlia District, Gagauzia, Taraclia District, then Bolhrad Raion in Ukraine and flow into Lake Yalpuh near the city of Bolhrad.

History 
In his paper Descriptio Moldaviae (Description of Moldavia), written in Latin 1714–1716, the scholar voivode Dimitrie Cantemir thus describes this river: "Cahulul, Salcia and Ialpuhul, which are in Moldavia and Bessarabia, increase the Danube. Of the latter, only the Ialpuh flows without consistency, the others are more stable than flowing."

References 

Rivers of Odesa Oblast
Rivers of Moldova
International rivers of Europe